Shmuel Pevzner (December 17, 1878 – May 7, 1930) was a Russian-born Jewish writer and industrialist. He was a delegate to the First World Zionist Congress in 1897, and one of the pioneers of settlement in Eretz Israel.

Biography 
Shmuel Pevzner was born in Propoysk. He received a traditional Jewish education and then studied engineering  at the Berlin Technical Institute, graduating in 1903. At the age of 18, he attended First Zionist Congress in Basel as its youngest delegate. In 1905, he immigrated to Palestine.
 
Pevzner married Leah Ginsberg, daughter of Ahad Ha'am. Pevzner's sister, Shifra, married the Jewish writer Mordechai Hakohen.

Business and public career
In 1909, Pevzner established the Atid soap factory in Haifa, which employed 100 workers. He was one of the founders of the   Hadar Hacarmel neighborhood in the city, and played a key role in the establishment of the Technion in April 1912.  
Pevzner served in the Haifa municipality and was a delegate to the Assembly of Representatives (Asefat ha-nivkharim).

Awards and recognition

Pevzner Street in Haifa is named after him.

References

 Zionists
 Jews in Ottoman Palestine
 Jews in Mandatory Palestine